Dina Nath Bhagat is an Indian politician and member of the Indian National Congress. Bhagat was a member of the Jammu and Kashmir Legislative Assembly from the Chanani constituency in Udhampur district elected on BJP ticket.

References 

People from Udhampur district
Bharatiya Janata Party politicians from Jammu and Kashmir
Living people
Jammu and Kashmir MLAs 2014–2018
Year of birth missing (living people)